Robert Shelton may refer to:

 Robert Shelton (critic) (1926–1995), music and film critic
 Robert Shelton (Ku Klux Klan) (1929–2003), Grand Wizard of United Klans of America
 Robert N. Shelton (born 1948), former President of the University of Arizona and current director of the Fiesta Bowl
 Robert C. Shelton Jr. (born 1934), American politician in the New Jersey General Assembly

See also
 Robert Sheldon (disambiguation)